Mary Fields Hall (October 14, 1934 – July 21, 2022) was the Director of the Navy Nurse Corps from 1987 to 1991.  She was the first U. S. military nurse to command a hospital. She became the commanding officer at Naval Hospital, Guantanamo Bay, Cuba, in July 1983, and later commanded Naval Hospital, Long Beach, California.

Early life 
Mary Fields Hall was born in 1934 in Pennsylvania. She earned a nursing diploma from Episcopal Hospital School of Nursing, Philadelphia, in 1955.

Navy Nurse Corps career 
She joined the Navy Nurse Corps in 1959. While in the Nurse Corps, she earned a Bachelor of Science degree from the Boston University in 1966 and a Master of Science degree in nursing service administration from the University of Maryland in 1973.

She became the commanding officer at Naval Hospital, Guantanamo Bay, Cuba, in July 1983, and later commanded Naval Hospital, Long Beach, California.

She became director of the Navy Nurse Corps in 1987, and was promoted to the rank of Rear Admiral (lower half). She served concurrently as deputy commander for Personnel Management, Naval Medical Command.

See also 
Navy Nurse Corps
Women in the United States Navy

References

Further reading

External links 
 Nurses and the U.S. Navy -- Overview and Special Image Selection Naval Historical Center

1934 births
2022 deaths
American nurses
American women nurses
Military personnel from Pennsylvania
Boston University alumni
University System of Maryland alumni
Female admirals of the United States Navy
United States Navy rear admirals (lower half)